James Maina Boi (4 April 1954 – 15 July 2004) was a Kenyan middle-distance runner. He is best known for winning the 800 metres distance at the 1978 All-Africa Games and a silver medal at the 1982 Commonwealth Games.

He also competed in 4 x 400 metres relay at the 1983 World Championships with the Kenyan team that was eliminated in the semi finals.

Boi died in 2004 following long-term illness.

Achievements

Boi also won two gold medals at the East African Championships in 1977 and 1979.

References

External links

1954 births
2004 deaths
Athletes (track and field) at the 1978 Commonwealth Games
Athletes (track and field) at the 1982 Commonwealth Games
Kenyan male middle-distance runners
Commonwealth Games silver medallists for Kenya
Commonwealth Games medallists in athletics
African Games gold medalists for Kenya
African Games medalists in athletics (track and field)
Athletes (track and field) at the 1978 All-Africa Games
Medallists at the 1982 Commonwealth Games